M. Matiur Rahman ( 11 July 1923 - 9 January 2018) age 95, briefly Matiur Rahman or Motiur, the former Minister (Communications), former Member of Parliament, former Secretary and former Ambassador.  He played an active role in the General Election of 1946. in 1964, he was appointed as the Joint Secretary of the Government and served as the Director of National Shipping Corporation and remained in the office for five years. In 1970, he took charge as additional secretary of the Government. He was the founding President of Barishal Samity and East Pakistan Federation in Karachi. M Matiur Rahman was arrested during the liberation war  Later, with the efforts from Bangabandhu Sheikh Mujibur Rahman and with the help of the Red Cross in an independent Bangladesh, M Matiur Rahman returned to his beloved homeland along with his family. After returning to Bangladesh, M Matiur Rahman joined as the Secretary of Ministry of Industries is a Jatiya Party (Ershad) politician and the former Member of Parliament of Barisal-5.

Career
Rahman was elected to parliament from Barisal-5 as a Jatiya Party candidate in 1986 and 1988. He served as the Minister of Communications from November 30, 1986 to March 26, 1988.

References

Jatiya Party politicians
1923 births
2018 deaths
3rd Jatiya Sangsad members
4th Jatiya Sangsad members
Road Transport and Bridges ministers of Bangladesh